Jimmy Walker (1881–1946) was an American politician.

Jimmy Walker may also refer to:

Jimmy Walker (basketball, born 1913) (1913–1943), American basketball coach
Jimmy Walker (basketball, born 1944) (1944–2007), American basketball player
Jimmy Walker (country musician) (1915–1990), American musician
Jimmy Walker (footballer, born 1925) (1925–?), Scottish footballer
Jimmy Walker (footballer, born 1932), Northern Irish footballer
Jimmy Walker (footballer, born 1973), English footballer
Jimmy Walker (golfer) (born 1979), American golfer
Jimmy Walker (table tennis) (born 1954), English table tennis player

See Also
James Walker (disambiguation), a disambiguation page for "James Walker"
Jimmie Walker (born 1947), American comedian and actor